Cyanea heluensis is a rare plant that was found near West Maui, The flower was first encountered in 2010 and formally named in 2020. There is only a single known wild individual of the species and it is prone to extinction by rats. The plant needs extra protection from parasites and other kind of plant illnesses. The plant is similar to Hāhā.  Cyanea heluensis has unique leaves. Its flowers are long, white, and gently curved. Cyanea heluensis attracts bird pollinators with orange fruit.

References

heluensis
Endemic flora of Hawaii
Plants described in 2020
Flora without expected TNC conservation status